The Assessors of Maat were 42 minor ancient Egyptian deities of the Maat charged with judging the souls of the dead in the afterlife by joining the judgment of Osiris in the Weighing of the Heart.

Description

Negative Confessions and psychostasia 

Chapter 125 of the Book of the Dead lists names and provenances (either geographical or atmospheric) of the Assessors of Maat. A declaration of innocence corresponds to each deity: it is pronounced by the dead himself, to avoid being damned for specific "sins" that each of the 42 Judges is in charge of punishing.

The deceased was accompanied in the presence of Osiris by the psychopomp god Anubis – where he would have declared that he was guilty of none of the "42 sins" against justice and truth by reciting a text known as "Negative confessions". The heart (ib / jb) of the deceased was then weighed on a two-plate scale: a plate for the heart, the other for the feather of Maat. Maat, in whose name the 42 judges who flanked Osiris acted, was the deification of truth, justice, rectitude, and order of the cosmos and was often symbolized by an ostrich feather (the hieroglyphic sign of her name). If the heart and the feather were equal, then the deities were convinced of the rectitude of the deceased, who could therefore access eternal life becoming mꜣꜥ-ḫrw (Egyptological pronunciation: Maa Kheru), which means "vindicated / justified", literally "true of voice" ("blessed" in a broad sense). But, if the heart was heavier than Maat's feather, then a terrifying monster named ꜥmmt "the Devourer" ("Ammit") devoured it by destroying the soul of the deceased.

The psychostasia episode is remarkable not only for its symbolic and even dramatic vivacity, but also because it is one of the few parts of the Book of the Dead with moral connotations. The judgment by Osiris and by the other 42 judicial deities, and the "Negative Confessions" themselves, depict the ethics and morality of the Egyptians. These 42 declarations of innocence were interpreted by some as possible historical precedents of the Ten Commandments: but, while the Ten Commandments of Judeo-Christian ethics consist of norms attributed to a divine revelation, the "Negative confessions" seem rather as divine transpositions (each corresponding to one of the 42 judging deities) of daily morality.

List of names, provenances and tasks (Wilkinson) 
The American egyptologist Richard Herbert Wilkinson thus inventoried, in his The Complete Gods and Goddesses of Ancient Egypt (2003), the 42 Assessors of Maat:

References

Notes

Bibliography 
 Budge, Ernest Alfred Wallis, The Egyptian Book of the Dead, Londra, New York, Penguin Books, 2008, . 
 Faulkner, Raymond O., von Dassow, Eva (editors), The Egyptian Book of the Dead, The Book of Going forth by Day. The First Authentic Presentation of the Complete Papyrus of Ani, San Francisco, Chronicle Books, 1994. 
 Hart, George, A Dictionary of Egyptian Gods and Goddesses, Routledge, 1986, . 
 Taylor, John H. (editor), Ancient Egyptian Book of the Dead: Journey through the afterlife, Londra, British Museum Press, 2010, . 
 Wilkinson, Richard H., The Complete Gods and Goddesses of Ancient Egypt, Thames & Hudson, 2003, .

Groups of Egyptian deities
Egyptian death gods
Book of the Dead